George Rae was a Scottish professional footballer who played in the Scottish League for Hibernian, Dunfermline Athletic, Dumbarton, Partick Thistle and Falkirk as a forward.

Personal life 
Rae served in the Royal Warwickshire Regiment during the First World War and rose to the rank of temporary second lieutenant. He was awarded the Silver Medal of Military Valor.

Career statistics

Honours 
Falkirk

 Stirlingshire Cup: 1909–10, 1919–20

References

1888 births
Scottish footballers
Scottish Football League players
British Army personnel of World War I
Royal Warwickshire Fusiliers officers
Association football forwards
Recipients of the Silver Medal of Military Valor
Hibernian F.C. players
Year of death missing
Dunfermline Athletic F.C. players
Dumbarton F.C. players
Partick Thistle F.C. players
Falkirk F.C. players
Footballers from Falkirk
Kirkcaldy United F.C. players